James Clair Wyant is professor at the College of Optical Sciences at the University of Arizona where he was Director (1999–2005)  and Dean (2005–2012).  He received a B.S. in physics from Case Western Reserve University and M.S. and Ph.D. in optics from the University of Rochester.

Career
He was a founder of the WYKO Corporation and served as its president and board chairman from 1984 to 1997  and he was a founder of the 4D Technology Corporation and currently serves as its board chairman.  Wyant is a member of the National Academy of Engineering, a Fellow of OSA (Optical Society of America), SPIE (International Society of Optics and Photonics), and the Optical Society of India, an honorary member of the Optical Society of Korea, and former editor-in-chief of the OSA journal Applied Optics.  He was the 2010 president of OSA  and the 1986 president of SPIE.  Since 2010 he has been a member of the Board of Trustees of Case Western Reserve University. In April of 2019, the College of Optical Sciences at the University of Arizona was renamed to be the James C. Wyant College of Optical Sciences in his honor.

Awards 

 AccountabilIT Lifetime Achievement Award from the Arizona Technology Council, 2019
 SPIE Visionary Award, 2019
 OSA Joseph Fraunhofer Award
 SPIE Gold Medal, 2003
 SPIE Technology Achievement Award
 SPIE Chandra Vikram Award
 University of Rochester College of Engineering Distinguished Alumnus Award
 Doctorado Honoris Causa from the Instituto Nacional de Astrofisica, Optica y Electronica in Puebla, Mexico. 
 Arizona's “Innovator of the Year” Product Award
 Tom Brown Excellence in Entrepreneurship Award
 University of Arizona Technology Innovation Award;
 Arizona Technology Council William F. McWhortor Award.

References

Year of birth missing (living people)
Living people
Optical physicists
Case Western Reserve University alumni
University of Rochester alumni
University of Arizona faculty
Members of the United States National Academy of Engineering